Fenton Lee Robinson (September 23, 1935 – November 25, 1997) was an American blues singer and exponent of the Chicago blues guitar.

Biography
Robinson was born near Greenwood, Mississippi. He left home at the age of 18 and moved to Memphis, Tennessee, where he recorded his first single "Tennessee Woman" in 1957. In 1959, he made his first recording of "As the Years Go Passing By", later recorded by several other blues artists. He settled in Chicago in 1962. He recorded his signature song, "Somebody Loan Me a Dime", in 1967 for the Palos label, the nationwide distribution of which was aborted by a freak snowstorm that hit Chicago. A cover version was recorded by Boz Scaggs in 1969, but the song was misattributed, and legal battles ensued. It has since become a blues standard, being "part of the repertoire of one out of every two blues artists", according to the Encyclopedia of Blues (1997).

Robinson re-recorded the song for the critically acclaimed album Somebody Loan Me a Dime in 1974, the first of three he recorded for Alligator Records. Robinson was nominated for a Grammy Award for the second, 1977's I Hear Some Blues Downstairs, which contained a rerecording of "As the Years Go Passing By". Robinson's third album for Alligator, Nightflight, was released in 1984.

Robinson played guitar on Larry Davis's original recording of "Texas Flood". Davis later became a guitar player, but for "Texas Flood" Robinson provided the distinctive guitar parts, with Davis on vocals and bass, flamboyant keyboardist James Booker on piano, David Dean on tenor saxophone, Booker Crutchfield on baritone saxophone and an unknown drummer.

In the 1970s Robinson was arrested and imprisoned for involuntary manslaughter in connection with a car accident. Paroled after nine months, he continued playing in Chicago clubs and later taught guitar.

Robinson died of complications from brain cancer, in Rockford, Illinois.

His signature song, "Somebody Loan Me a Dime", was used in the film The Blues Brothers; the song is playing on the radio when Jake (John Belushi) is being transported and paroled.

See also
List of blues musicians
List of Chicago blues musicians
List of Texas blues musicians
List of Electric blues musicians
Chicago Blues Festival

References

External links
 [ Biography] at Allmusic website

1935 births
1997 deaths
People from Greenwood, Mississippi
American blues guitarists
American male guitarists
American blues singers
Blues musicians from Mississippi
Electric blues musicians
Duke Records artists
Deaths from brain cancer in the United States
Deaths from cancer in Illinois
Texas blues musicians
Chicago blues musicians
20th-century American singers
20th-century American guitarists
Guitarists from Illinois
Guitarists from Mississippi
Guitarists from Texas
Alligator Records artists
USA Records artists
Meteor Records artists
20th-century American male musicians